Chanteau is a commune in the Loiret department in north-central France. It is part of the functional urban area of Orléans.

See also
Communes of the Loiret department

References

Communes of Loiret